Qingjie or Qing was a legendary leader of the Ji clan, which eventually established the Zhou dynasty in ancient China. He is sometimes credited as a Duke of Zhou or with founding the city of Bin.

Traditional accounts list his father as Duke Liu and his son as Huangpu. He succeeded the throne after Duke Liu.

See also 
 Buzhu 不窋

References

Ancient Chinese people
Zhou dynasty nobility